Stéfan Voléry, born 17 September 1961, is a former freestyle swimmer from Switzerland.

Stéfan competed in the 50 metre freestyle at the 1988 Summer Olympics in Seoul, Korea, finishing fifth in the Championship Final in a time of 22.84 seconds.

He competed in the 100 metre freestyle also, finishing third in the B Final in a time of 50.74 seconds.

He finished 3rd at European Championship in 1985 and 1987.

References

1961 births
Living people
Olympic swimmers of Switzerland
Swimmers at the 1980 Summer Olympics
Swimmers at the 1984 Summer Olympics
Swimmers at the 1988 Summer Olympics
Swimmers at the 1992 Summer Olympics
European Aquatics Championships medalists in swimming
Swiss male freestyle swimmers